Wings Over Africa is a 1936 British adventure film directed by Ladislao Vajda and starring Joan Gardner, Ian Colin, James Harcourt and James Carew.

The film is a quota quickie produced for released by RKO. It was shot at Shepperton Studios with sets designed by the art director Duncan Sutherland. The film score was created by composer Jack Beaver.

Plot
Explorer Tony Cooper and homesick trader Norton find a skeleton in the African jungle with a package intended to be delivered to Victor Wilkins in London. Cooper takes it there and it proves to be from Wilkins' brother - the skeleton was his - with a map showing where he left £100,000 in diamonds for Victor. Cooper agrees to accompany him to Africa and they hire pilots John Trevor and Carol Reed, who all agree to a cut of the profits. On arrival in Africa, they're challenged by three men - Redfern, Collins and Quincey - who claim to have the mineral rights to all gems found in the area, and by Norton, who also wants a share. But Norton is stabbed to death and Trevor fatally wounded: suspicion falls on Cooper, who's in love with Carol. Carol investigates and finds the weapon in the possession of Wilkins, who wanted the diamonds all for himself. He tries to flee in one of the planes but crashes and is killed.

Cast
 Joan Gardner as Carol Reade
 Ian Colin as Tony Cooper
 James Harcourt as Wikins
 James Carew as Norton
 James Craven as John Trevor
 Alan Napier as Redfern
 Phil Thomas as Quincey
 Charles Oliver as Collins
 Rufus Fennell as Saoud

References

Bibliography
 Chibnall, Steve. Quota Quickies: The Birth of the British 'B' Film. British Film Institute, 2007.
 Low, Rachael. Filmmaking in 1930s Britain. George Allen & Unwin, 1985.
 Wood, Linda. British Films, 1927-1939. British Film Institute, 1986.

External links

1936 films
1936 adventure films
British adventure films
1930s English-language films
Films directed by Ladislao Vajda
Treasure hunt films
Films set in Africa
Films scored by Jack Beaver
British black-and-white films
Quota quickies
Films shot at Shepperton Studios
RKO Pictures films
Films with screenplays by Patrick Kirwan
1930s British films